The SNCAC Martinet was a German-designed but French-built twin-engined military trainer and light transport monoplane. It was operated by the French military and in small numbers by French airlines from the late 1940s.

Development
To aide the German war effort the SNCAC factory at Bourges was ordered to produce 455 Siebel Si 204s light transports for the Luftwaffe. Production started in 1942 and 168 had been delivered before the Liberation stopped production. The French decided to continue producing the aircraft and designated the aircraft NC.700. Only a prototype NC.700 was built powered by Renault 12S-00 engines (derived from the German AS-411) although the designation was also used for a small number of aircraft originally intended for the Luftwaffe and diverted to the French Air Force.

The company then produced two variants; the NC.701 Martinet based on the Si 204D with a glazed unstepped nose and powered by two Renault 12S engines, and the NC.702 Martinet with a conventional stepped windscreen nose based on the Si 204A.

Operational history
The Martinet was used by both the French Air Force and Navy and the final example did not retire until 1963. A small number were used by commercial operators including Air France but were soon replaced by larger aircraft like the Douglas DC-3. A number were used by the French Postal Service but they were grounded following an accident to F-BBFA is July 1946. The aircraft was used by the IGN for photo-survey work and a few aircraft were also exported to Poland and Sweden for use on photo-mapping duties.

Variants
NC.700
A Renault 12S powered Si-204, one prototype.
NC.701
Trainer version with dual controls and transparent nose based on the Si-204D. Room for five students as a radio trainer.
NC.702
Eight-seat transport version based on the Si-204A.

Operators

Air France
French Air Force
French Navy

 LOT Polish Airlines operated 6 NC.701 for aerial photography in 1947-1948.
 Polish Air Forces operated 6 aircraft taken from LOT airlines in 1948 for aerial photography until the 1950s.

 Rikets Allmänna Kartverk operated five aircraft for aerial photography and survey.

Survivors
NC.702 282 with the Conservatoire de l'Air et de l'Espace d'Aquitaine, France
NC.702 331 with the Deutsches Technikmuseum, Berlin, Germany
NC.701 SE-KAL on display at the Air and Space Museum, Arlanda, Stockholm, Sweden.

Specifications (NC.701)

See also

References

External links

Siebel Si 204

1940s French military trainer aircraft
Low-wing aircraft
Twin piston-engined tractor aircraft
SNCAC aircraft
Siebel aircraft
Aircraft first flown in 1944
Twin-tail aircraft